These are some of Necaxa football club records from 1923–present

Most appearances

Necaxa's Season lead scorers in the Amateur Football League or Liga Mayor de D.F (1923–1937)

Necaxa's Season Career Scorers in the Liga De Ascenso

Necaxa's Season lead scorers in the First Division League

Necaxa's Top three Single Season lead scorers in the First Division League
Single Season play began in 1996

Necaxa's Single Season Assist leaders in the First Division League

Necaxa's top ten leading strikers

Club Necaxa's Goal Keeping records

Club Necaxa Managerial statistics 

 Amateur era 1920–1943
no football played in 1930–1931 season
"Professional Mexican" football begins 1943 in Mexico(Early Capitalism)
Athletico Espanol
"Professional Mexican" football begins 1997 in Mexico(Advanced Capitalism)

Club Records
 Most Goals in National Championship: 9–0 vs Atlante (27-Oct-1934)
 Most Goals in a Single season : 5–0 vs Pachuca (27-Sept-2005)
 Most Goals in an International Tournament: 6–0 vs Morelia (26-Feb-2002)
 Best Position in Table: 1º (Season 1992–1993)
 Worst Position in Table: 18º (2009)
 Longest undefeated streak: 29 games (Fall 2009 + Spring 2010)

Individual Necaxa Footballer Awards

CONCACAF Footballer of the Year
The following players have won the CONCACAF Footballer of the Year award while playing for Club Necaxa:
  Adolfo Ríos (1996–97)
  Adolfo Ríos (1998)

CONCACAF Youth Footballer of the Year
  Luis Pérez (1999)

Bicentennial Golden Footballer of the Year 2010
  Pablo Quatrocchi (2010)

Coaching History

Player/Coach/Captain

Necaxa footballers(free-agency economic model)

Footnotes

Club Necaxa